Soledad Esperón (born 8 February 1985) is a retired Argentine tennis player.

She won ten singles and 25 doubles titles on the ITF circuit in her career. Her highest WTA singles ranking is 166, which she reached on 23 March 2009. Her career high in doubles is 139, set on 2 October 2006.

Esperón made her WTA Tour main-draw debut at the 2009 Copa Sony Ericsson Colsanitas in the doubles event partnering Tamaryn Hendler.

Partnering Monique Adamczak, Esperón won her first $75k tournament in April 2006 at the Hardee's Pro Classic, defeating Edina Gallovits and Varvara Lepchenko in the final.

ITF finals

Singles: 17 (10–7)

Doubles: 43 (25–18)

External links

 
 

1985 births
Living people
Argentine female tennis players
Tennis players from Buenos Aires
South American Games medalists in tennis
South American Games bronze medalists for Argentina
Competitors at the 2002 South American Games
20th-century Argentine women
21st-century Argentine women